In enzymology, a dTDP-6-deoxy-L-talose 4-dehydrogenase is an enzyme that catalyzes the chemical reaction

dTDP-6-deoxy-L-talose + NADP+  dTDP-4-dehydro-6-deoxy-L-mannose + NADPH + H+

Thus, the two substrates of this enzyme are dTDP-6-deoxy-L-talose and NADP+, whereas its 3 products are dTDP-4-dehydro-6-deoxy-L-mannose, NADPH, and H+.

This enzyme belongs to the family of oxidoreductases, specifically those acting on the CH-OH group of donor with NAD+ or NADP+ as acceptor. The systematic name of this enzyme class is dTDP-6-deoxy-L-talose:NADP+ 4-oxidoreductase. Other names in common use include thymidine diphospho-6-deoxy-L-talose dehydrogenase, TDP-6-deoxy-L-talose dehydrogenase, thymidine diphospho-6-deoxy-L-talose dehydrogenase, and dTDP-6-deoxy-L-talose dehydrogenase (4-reductase). This enzyme participates in nucleotide sugars metabolism.

References

 

EC 1.1.1
NADPH-dependent enzymes
Enzymes of unknown structure